Let the Record Play may refer to:

 "Let the Record Play", a song by Ugly Kid Joe from Uglier Than They Used ta Be
 "Let the Record Play", a song and album by Moon Taxi
 Let the Record Play (album)